David Packer is a New York based artist who works in a variety of media: sculpture, drawing, and artist books. The subject matter is that of the everyday: vehicles, plastic water bottles, car engines, dogs, bears, and other animals that come from different areas of interest: technology, industry, and the natural world. “He cleverly manipulates prevailing contemporary ideology to grand effect, making aesthetically pleasing art with socially critical impact.”

Content and media 

Packer’s process includes distinct and different, but all inter-related, media, beginning with an enormous collection of photographic images, both analog and digital. As he notes, “My process now is much more image based, in terms of what I will see in an object, if I find an object with resonance, with a depth of meaning.” The resonance, that informs the content of all the work, regardless of media, may include “industry, corporations, how the land is being used, how corporations are taking stuff from the land.”

Large scale, serial works on paper, including mixed media collages, drawings, and highly detailed plans are “patiently and methodically constructed with mechanical precision” and “beautifully conceived and meticulously drawn.” These drawings are crucial to the design and construction of the ensuing sculptures as well as functioning at the same time as independent works of art. The artist books that Packer has made, some unique, some collaged, and some limited edition, parallel the work on paper.

As a sculptor, Packer works primarily in ceramics, and has been described “as a master practitioner of architectural and technical ceramics”; however, he also has used found lumber and discarded industrial metal, highlighting his “investigation of the visual qualities of old and new technologies,” often with “redundant technology imaging redundant industry.” The themes that are important to the artist—industry, technology, nature and humankind’s relationship to these issues—find full form in the sculptures that include rusty metal trucks, dancing bears, Vietnam-era helicopters, and malarial mosquitoes.

Even though “illuminating ecological conditions is no mean accomplishment,” Packer’s work has a strong element of warning, like other “future-conscious artists and creative thinkers”—an awareness of the existence of the “post-industrial moment, a post-industrial vacuum, where not even the cleaners are working.” The ceramic sculpture Bears that Dance is a direct example of warning, with two white polar bears linked together in some ill-defined and strange symbiotic human like relationship. Ultimately Packer “allows his work to become that which it calls into question: namely the rational over the natural.”

Exhibitions and residencies 

Since 1983, Packer has exhibited both nationally and internationally, with over 15 one-person shows and over 50 group shows. Two notable exhibitions in New York City are a one person show at Garth Clark Gallery in 2002, where he also had three other group shows, and participation in the group show, Exit Biennial II, Traffic, at Exit Art, 2005, curated by Papo Colo and Jeanette Ingberman.

In 2006, a three-month residency at the Kohler Arts/Industry program allowed the artist to realize a significant and ambitious project: full-size cast ceramic sculptures of V8 car engines. This work, called The Last of the V8s, was both more complex and more ambitious than anything he had tried before. In Packer’s own words: “I never thought how appropriate it would be to manufacture a quintessentially American industrial object in a factory setting.” These sculptures were also included in the show The Moment at Hand at the John Michael Kohler Arts Center, as well as subsequently in galleries in New York, Chicago, and Seattle. The predominant use of industrial imagery in such projects and “the never-ending, osmotic flow that underwrites cultural exchange” creates in Packer’s work “a 21st Century elegy for American industrial might” where “the dominant note becomes poignancy.” 

Described as an artist “not unaccustomed to functioning outside of his element,” Packer has also shown overseas, often as part of an extended stay at an international residency. This includes three one person shows in Morocco, two in 2012, in Rabat at LeCube Independent Art Room and in Fez as part of the Fez Sacred Music Festival, and in 2019 at Jardin Anima, Marrakech. He has also shown in Tokyo, during a residency at Youkobu Artist in Residence, as well as in Vallauris, France, with a show called Pèlerinage. Other residencies include MacDowell, Yaddo, and Virginia Center for the Creative Arts.

Collections and curating 

Packer’s work is included in the public collections of the Carnegie Museum of Art, the John Michael Kohler Arts Center, and the Museum of Art and Design. Private collections include those of Sonny Kamm, Kate Shepherd, Nawal Slaoui, and Jack Zipes. Between 2015 and 2018, Packer curated three exhibitions at Spring/Break Art Show.

Travel and other projects 

Traveling, both for its own sake or as an artist, is an important part of Packer’s practice. He has visited four continents: some countries visited include Australia, Belgium, Cambodia, France, Greece, India, Mexico, Spain, Syria, and Thailand.

The first time Packer was a Fulbright Scholar to Morocco, in Fez in 2011, after three exhibitions of his own work there, he wrote a book on the diversity of Moroccan ceramics. The Earth has Three Colors: a celebration of Moroccan ceramics is the first full-length publication to provide a comprehensive overview of the ceramics of Morocco; this hardbound edition, with 280 pages and ten chapters, written in English with a French translation, was published in 2019 by Mazda Publishers. That same year, he received a Core Fulbright Scholar award to Morocco to continue research and promote his book. Since the book was published, including a successful crowdfunding campaign, Packer has given numerous lectures, including Greenwich House Pottery in the United States, and the American Legation, Tangier and the Villa des Arts, Rabat in Morocco.

Biography, education, and teaching 

Packer was born in Amersham, England in 1960 and has lived in the United States since 1983, including Washington DC, Miami, Tallahassee and, since 1994, New York City. He is a dual British and American citizen and currently maintains a studio in Long Island City.

Art school in the United Kingdom included Buckinghamshire College of Further Education (1979–80) and Bristol School of Art (1980-83) where Packer received a BFA in ceramics. He finished his formal education in the United States at Florida State University, graduating with an MFA in Studio Art in 1994.

Packer has taught ceramics, including tile making and wheel throwing, drawing, and computer art: schools include Greenwich House Pottery, the Crafts Students League, both in New York City, and Western Carolina University, including the graduate program.

Packer met his wife, artist Margaret Lanzetta, at Exit Art in 1995.

References

External links 
 Official Website

1960 births
Living people
People from Amersham